Jelena Dimitrijević (born 26 August 1986) is a Serbian football striker currently playing in the Greek Championship for PAOK Thessaloniki. She has played the Champions League with Mašinac Niš and PAOK.

She is a member of the Serbian national team.

References

1986 births
Living people
Serbian women's footballers
Serbia women's international footballers
Expatriate women's footballers in Greece
Serbian expatriate footballers
Serbian expatriate sportspeople in Greece
Women's association football forwards
PAOK FC (women) players
ŽFK Mašinac PZP Niš players